Seiwa can refer to:

 Emperor Seiwa, emperor of Japan
 Seiwa, Mie, a district in Mie, Japan
 Seiwa, Kumamoto, a village located in Kumamoto Prefecture, Japan
 Seiwa College, in Nishinomiya, Hyōgo, Japan
 Seiwa University, in Kisarazu, Chiba, Japan

See also